is a Japanese professional shogi player ranked 7-dan.

Early life
Chūza was born in Wakkanai, Hokkaido on February 3, 1970. He was accepted into the Japan Shogi Association's apprentice school at the rank of 6-kyū in November 1981 under the tutelage of shogi professional , was promoted to the rank of 1-dan in 1988, and obtained full professional status and the rank of 4-dan in April 1996.

Theoretical contributions
The Side Pawn Capture variation Chūza's Rook (中座飛車 chūza hisha, also known the R-85 variation 横歩取り8五飛), which became a very popular strategy, is named after him.

Personal life
Chuza is married to retired female shogi professional Akiko Nakakura. The couple married in November 2003, and have three children.

Promotion history
The promotion history for Chūza is as follows:
 6-kyū: 1981
 1-dan: 1988
 4-dan: April 1, 1996
 5-dan: August 17, 2001
 6-dan: April 11, 2007
 7-dan: September 20, 2007

Awards and honors
Chūza received the Japan Shogi Association's Masuda Award for his "Chūza's Rook" opening variation in 1998.

References

External links
ShogiHub: Professional Player Info · Chuza, Makoto

1970 births
Japanese shogi players
Living people
Professional shogi players
Professional shogi players from Hokkaido
Recipients of the Kōzō Masuda Award